Walter Herbert Warren (25 June 1876 – 8 July 1942) was an Australian rules footballer who played with Melbourne in the Victorian Football League (VFL).

Notes

External links 

1876 births
1942 deaths
Australian rules footballers from Bendigo
Melbourne Football Club players